The Global Food Security Index consists of a set of indices from 113 countries. It measures food security across most of the countries of the world. It was first published in 2012, and is managed and updated annually by The Economist's intelligence unit.

Global Food Production 
Food security differs around the world, with some regions being much more prone to food insecurity due to both lack of fertile land, as well as capital that could procure sufficient food through the purchasing of imports. This demand for food is steadily growing, especially in developing countries, with studies showing it is likely to grow between 70%-100% over the next four decades. Much research is underway to increase the productivity of crops, and therefore cultivate a greater volume of food. But, unless that research extends to countries characterized by poor, high-density populations, Global Food Security Index scores are likely to decrease in the coming years. Some journals, such as Science, suggest that it is imported that play the biggest role in producing these index scores, as in developing countries, a much greater percentage of the working force is dedicated to agriculture, yet they remain the countries with the lowest Global Food Security Index Scores. This is further illustrated by the fact that the United States and Singapore consistently have the two highest Global Food Security Index scores, even though the portion of their respective economies dealing with agriculture is comparatively negligible.

Criteria
The following parameters are considered for giving ranking to the countries.
 Nutritional standards
 Urban absorption capacity
 Food consumption as a share of household expenditure
 Food loss
 Protein quality
 Agricultural import tariffs
 Diet diversification
 Agricultural infrastructure
 Volatility of agricultural production
 Proportion of population under the global poverty line
 Gross domestic product per capita (US$ PPP)
 Presence of food safety net programs
 Access to financing for farmers
 Public expenditure on agricultural R&D
 Corruption
 Political stability risk
 Sufficiency of supply
 Food safety

2022
Source:

2019

References

External links
 

Food security
Global economic indicators